Guatteria insignis is a species of plant in the Annonaceae family. It is endemic to Suriname.

References

 World Conservation Monitoring Centre 1998.  Guatteria insignis.   2006 IUCN Red List of Threatened Species.   Downloaded on 21 August 2007.

insignis
Endemic flora of Suriname
Data deficient plants
Near threatened biota of South America
Taxonomy articles created by Polbot